The Messenger (French: Le messager, or also known as Messenger Boy) is a 1937 French drama film directed by Raymond Rouleau and starring Gaby Morlay, Jean Gabin and Mona Goya. It was based on a play by Henri Bernstein. Morlay reprised her role while Victor Francen, who had played the male lead on stage, was replaced by Gabin.

It was shot at the Joinville Studios in Paris and the Victorine Studios in Nice. The film's art direction was by Eugène Lourié.

Synopsis
After leaving his socialite wife to marry her secretary, Nick Dange finds his well-connected wife has arranged for him to be made unemployable in Paris. The only work that he is able to get is to manage a mine in Uganda.

He feels lonely and isolated, thousands of miles from his wife. His only companion is a fellow worker named Jack. When Jack returns to Paris after being injured, Nick asks him to take a message to his wife.

Yet she is also lonely and begins an affair with Jack, who has already come to idolize her from the descriptions that Nick had made back in Africa. Yet when Nick returns to Paris and discovers the illicit relationship, Jack commits suicide.

Cast
 Gaby Morlay as Marie
 Jean Gabin as Nick Dange  
 Mona Goya as Pierrette  
 Maurice Escande as Géo  
 Henri Guisol as Jack  
 Pierre Alcover as Morel  
 Ernest Ferny as L'industriel  
 Betty Rowe as Florence  
  as Dolly  
 Jean-Pierre Aumont as Gilbert Rollin 
 Bernard Blier as Le chauffeur de Nick  
 Lucien Coëdel as L'agent  
  as Le notaire  
 Jean Témerson as Le maître d'hôtel  
 Robert Vattier as Le représentant

References

Bibliography 
 Kennedy-Karpat, Colleen. Rogues, Romance, and Exoticism in French Cinema of the 1930s. Fairleigh Dickinson, 2013.

External links 
 

1937 films
1930s French-language films
Films directed by Raymond Rouleau
Films set in Paris
Films set in Uganda
French films based on plays
French action drama films
1930s action drama films
1937 drama films
Films shot at Joinville Studios
Films shot at Victorine Studios
Pathé films
1930s French films